Rustem Usmanov (born 12 September 1985) is a Kyrgyzstan footballer, who plays for FC Abdish-Ata Kant as a defender.

International career
He is a member of the Kyrgyzstan national football team from 2009.

Career statistics

International

Statistics accurate as of match played 5 September 2014

International Goals

References

External links

1985 births
Living people
Kyrgyzstani footballers
Kyrgyzstan international footballers
Association football defenders